Andreea Amalia Roșca (born 20 March 1999) is a Romanian tennis player.

She has won one doubles title on the WTA Challenger Tour with 12 singles titles and 14 doubles titles on the ITF Women's Circuit.

Roșca made her WTA Tour main-draw debut at the 2018 Bucharest Open where she received a wildcard into the singles draw and lost her first-round match to Claire Liu.

WTA 125 tournament finals

Doubles: 1 (title)

ITF Circuit finals

Singles: 20 (12 titles, 8 runner–ups)

Doubles: 22 (14 titles, 8 runner–ups)

References

External links
 
 

1999 births
Living people
Romanian female tennis players